Westler is a 1985 film originally produced for West German television and later released in cinema. It was directed by Wieland Speck and broadcast on ZDF.

Synopsis
Felix is visited in West Berlin by an American friend from Los Angeles. The two make a day trip to East Berlin where they meet Thomas. Thomas and Felix fall in love but are divided by the Wall, much like all of Germany at the time. Felix tries to keep their relationship strong by making regular visits to Thomas in the East, but this raises the suspicions of the East German authorities. Eventually, Thomas seeks to flee to West Germany by flying to Prague, where a Czech friend has arranged a contact with an escape helper.

Background 
Westler is noteworthy for its realistic portrayal of a gay relationship under difficult circumstances, as well as for having been filmed partly in East Berlin without permission from East German authorities.

Cast
 Sigurd Rachman as Felix
 Rainer Strecker as Thomas
 Andy Lucas as Bruce
 Frank Rediess as Bernie
 Andreas Bernhardt as Jürgen
 Sasha Kogo as Elke
 Hans-Jürgen Punte as Lutze
 Zazie de Paris as night club singer
 Harry Baer as Customs officer
 Christoph Eichhorn as actor
 Jörg Uwe Dost as Guest at the bar
 Thomas Kretschmann as Soldier
 Georges Stamkowski as Pavel
 The Waltons as the Band
 Martin Zastrow as Band member
 Engelbert Rehm as Band member
 Andrew Kelner as little child

Awards
 Max Ophüls Festival, Audience Award, 1985
 San Francisco International Gay & Lesbian Film Festival, Audience Award, 1986
 Torino International Gay & Lesbian Film Festival, the Festival's Plate, 1987

Reception
The film gained a Rotten Tomatoes rating of 50%.
Helmut Schödel in Die Zeit said "… secretly must be filmed, secretly loved … it's about love, not about truth … I'm excited …"
 Encyclopedia of International Film : "A film about one in the multiple sense, love between the systems"; He tries to describe the Berlin Wall not only as an obstacle between people and political blocs, but also as a borderline between the Old and New World. "
 Uwe Witiatock, from Frankfurter Allgemeine Zeitung said "Partially without official filming permission and therefore filmed with a hidden camera, the divided city of Berlin has an unreal, foreign atmosphere, as if we were in Hong Kong or Singapore. You feel like being in the role of a visitor to a zoo, marveling at the conditions under which beings live in a completely different world."
 taz: "The love story between the young men is extremely pleasant, unobtrusive and unimaginably self-evident. Partially filmed with a hidden camera on original DDR locations, Westler is one of the few German productions that is worthwhile!"

References

External links
 

1985 films
1985 television films
1980s German-language films
German LGBT-related films
1985 romantic drama films
Films set in Berlin
Films set in 1985
West German films
Films shot in Berlin
Films set in the 1980s
LGBT-related romantic drama films
1985 LGBT-related films
Films shot in the Czech Republic
1980s German films